A variational principle in physics is an alternative method for determining the state or dynamics of a physical system, by identifying it as an extremum (minimum, maximum or saddle point) of a function or functional.  This article describes the historical development of such principles.

Before modern times

Variational principles are found among earlier ideas in surveying and optics. The rope stretchers of ancient Egypt stretched corded ropes between two points to measure the path which minimized the distance of separation, and Claudius Ptolemy, in his Geographia (Bk 1, Ch 2), emphasized that one must correct for "deviations from a straight course"; in ancient Greece Euclid states in his Catoptrica that, for the path of light reflecting from a mirror, the angle of incidence equals the angle of reflection; and Hero of Alexandria later showed that this path was the shortest length and least time.

This was generalized to refraction by Pierre de Fermat, who, in the 17th century, refined the principle to "light travels between two given points along the path of shortest time"; now known as the principle of least time or Fermat's principle.

Principle of extremal action
Credit for the formulation of the principle of least action is commonly given to Pierre Louis Maupertuis, who wrote about it in 1744 and 1746, although the true priority is less clear, as discussed below.

Maupertuis felt that "Nature is thrifty in all its actions", and applied the principle broadly: "The laws of movement and of rest deduced from this principle being precisely the same as those observed in nature, we can admire the application of it to all phenomena. The movement of animals, the vegetative growth of plants ... are only its consequences; and the spectacle of the universe becomes so much the grander, so much more beautiful, the worthier of its Author, when one knows that a small number of laws, most wisely established, suffice for all movements." 

In application to physics, Maupertuis suggested that the quantity to be minimized was the product of the duration (time) of movement within a system by the "vis viva", twice what we now call the kinetic energy of the system.

Leonhard Euler gave a formulation of the action principle in 1744, in very recognizable terms, in the Additamentum 2 to his "Methodus Inveniendi Lineas Curvas Maximi Minive Proprietate Gaudentes". He begins the second paragraph:

"Sit massa corporis projecti ==M, ejusque, dum spatiolum == ds emetitur, celeritas debita altitudini == v; erit quantitas motus corporis in hoc loco ==  ; quae per ipsum spatiolum ds multiplicata, dabit  motum corporis collectivum per spatiolum ds. Iam dico lineam a corpore descriptam ita fore comparatam, ut, inter omnes alias lineas iisdem terminis contentas, sit , seu, ob M constans,  minimum."

A translation of this passage reads:

"Let the mass of the projectile be M, and let its squared velocity resulting from its height be  while being moved over a distance ds.   The body will have a momentum  that, when multiplied by the distance ds, will give , the momentum of the body integrated over the distance ds.  Now I assert that the curve thus described by the body to be the curve (from among all other curves connecting the same endpoints) that minimizes  or, provided that  M is constant, ."

As Euler states,  is the integral of the momentum over distance traveled (note that here  contrary to usual notation denotes the squared velocity) which, in modern notation, equals the reduced action .  Thus, Euler made an equivalent and (apparently) independent statement of the variational principle in the same year as Maupertuis, albeit slightly later. In rather general terms he wrote that "Since the fabric of the Universe is most perfect and is the work of a most wise Creator, nothing whatsoever takes place in the Universe in which some relation of maximum and minimum does not appear."
However, Euler did not claim any priority, as the following episode shows.

Maupertuis' priority was disputed in 1751 by the mathematician Samuel König, who claimed that it had been invented by Gottfried Leibniz in 1707.  Although similar to many of Leibniz's arguments, the principle itself has not been documented in Leibniz's works.  König himself showed a copy of a 1707 letter from Leibniz to Jacob Hermann with the principle, but the original letter has been lost. In contentious proceedings, König was accused of forgery, and even the King of Prussia entered the debate, defending Maupertuis, while Voltaire defended König. Euler, rather than claiming priority, was a staunch defender of Maupertuis, and Euler himself prosecuted König for forgery before the Berlin Academy on 13 April 1752. The claims of forgery were re-examined 150 years later, and archival work by C.I. Gerhardt in 1898 and W. Kabitz in 1913 uncovered other copies of the letter, and three others cited by König, in the Bernoulli archives.

Further developments 
Euler continued to write on the topic; in his Reflexions sur quelques loix generales de la nature (1748), he called the quantity "effort". His expression corresponds to what we would now call potential energy, so that his statement of least action in statics is equivalent to the principle that a system of bodies at rest will adopt a configuration that minimizes total potential energy.

The full importance of the principle to mechanics was stated by Joseph Louis Lagrange in 1760, although the variational principle was not used to derive the equations of motion until almost 75 years later, when William Rowan Hamilton in 1834 and 1835  applied the variational principle to the function  to obtain what are now called the Lagrangian equations of motion.

Alternative formulations 
In 1842, Carl Gustav Jacobi tackled the problem of whether the variational principle found minima or other extrema (e.g. a saddle point); most of his work focused on geodesics on two-dimensional surfaces.  The first clear general statements were given by Marston Morse in the 1920s and 1930s,  leading to what is now known as Morse theory. For example, Morse showed that the number of conjugate points in a trajectory equaled the number of negative eigenvalues in the second variation of the Lagrangian.

Other extremal principles of classical mechanics have been formulated, such as Gauss' principle of least constraint and its corollary, Hertz's principle of least curvature.

By field

Electromagnetism
The action for electromagnetism is:

In relativity theory
The Einstein–Hilbert action which gives rise to the vacuum Einstein field equations is
,

Quantum mechanics
 Sum over possible paths, Feynman approach. See Path integral formulation
 Dirac-Frenkel Variational Principle

Apparent teleology
Although equivalent mathematically, there is an important philosophical difference between the differential equations of motion and their integral counterpart.  The differential equations are statements about quantities localized to a single point in space or single moment of time.  For example, Newton's second law  states that the instantaneous force  applied to a mass  produces an acceleration  at the same instant.  By contrast, the action principle is not localized to a point; rather, it involves integrals over an interval of time and (for fields) extended region of space.  Moreover, in the usual formulation of classical action principles, the initial and final states of the system are fixed, e.g.,

Given that the particle begins at position  at time  and ends at position  at time , the physical trajectory that connects these two endpoints is an extremum of the action integral.

In particular, the fixing of the final state appears to give the action principle a teleological character which has been controversial historically.  This apparent teleology is eliminated in the quantum mechanical version of the action principle.

References

  P.L.N. de Maupertuis, Accord de différentes lois de la nature qui avaient jusqu'ici paru incompatibles. (1744) Mém. As. Sc. Paris p. 417.
  P.L.N. de Maupertuis, Le lois de mouvement et du repos, déduites d'un principe de métaphysique. (1746) Mém. Ac. Berlin, p. 267.
  Leonhard Euler, Methodus Inveniendi Lineas Curvas Maximi Minive Proprietate Gaudentes. (1744) Bousquet, Lausanne & Geneva. 320 pages. Reprinted in Leonhardi Euleri Opera Omnia: Series I vol 24. (1952) C. Cartheodory (ed.) Orell Fuessli, Zurich. scanned copy of complete text at The Euler Archive, Dartmouth.
  W.R. Hamilton, "On a General Method in Dynamics.", Philosophical Transactions of the Royal Society Part I (1834) p.247-308; Part II (1835) p. 95-144. (From the collection Sir William Rowan Hamilton (1805-1865): Mathematical Papers edited by David R. Wilkins, School of Mathematics, Trinity College, Dublin 2, Ireland. (2000); also reviewed as On a General Method in Dynamics)
  G.C.J. Jacobi, Vorlesungen über Dynamik, gehalten an der Universität Königsberg im Wintersemester 1842-1843. A. Clebsch (ed.) (1866); Reimer; Berlin. 290 pages, available online  Œuvres complètes volume 8 at Gallica-Math from the Gallica Bibliothèque nationale de France.
  Gerhardt CI. (1898) "Über die vier Briefe von Leibniz, die Samuel König in dem Appel au public, Leide MDCCLIII, veröffentlicht hat", Sitzungsberichte der Königlich Preussischen Akademie der Wissenschaften, I, 419–427.
  Kabitz W. (1913) "Über eine in Gotha aufgefundene Abschrift des von S. König in seinem Streite mit Maupertuis und der Akademie veröffentlichten, seinerzeit für unecht erklärten Leibnizbriefes", Sitzungsberichte der Königlich Preussischen Akademie der Wissenschaften, II, 632–638.
  Marston Morse (1934). "The Calculus of Variations in the Large", American Mathematical Society Colloquium Publication 18; New York.
  Chris Davis. Idle theory (1998)
  Euler, Methodus Inveniendi Lineas Curvas Maximi Minive Proprietate Gaudentes: Additamentum II, Ibid.
  J J O'Connor and E F Robertson, "The Berlin Academy and forgery", (2003), at The MacTutor History of Mathematics archive.
 Cassel, Kevin W.: Variational Methods with Applications in Science and Engineering, Cambridge University Press, 2013.

Calculus of variations
Variational principles in physics